Ohm is a lunar impact crater that is located on the far side of the Moon. It lies to the south of the crater Comrie, and the satellite crater Comrie K is attached to Ohm's northeastern rim. To the northwest is the larger Shternberg, and to the southwest is Kamerlingh Onnes.

This crater is located at the origin of an extensive ray system that extends for several hundred kilometers across the surrounding lunar terrain. The exterior surface for about 20–30 km is relatively free of the ray material, but beyond that perimeter is a skirt of higher albedo, with streaks extending to the northwest, east-northeast, and southwards.  The crater is part of the Copernican System.

The outer rim of Ohm is sharply defined, except at the southern end where the edge is somewhat irregular. The inner surface drops down to an interior blanket of slumped material that slopes down to the floor. The crater lacks a notable central peak.

References

 
 
 
 
 
 
 
 
 
 
 
 

Impact craters on the Moon